Keith Matthew Tkachuk (born March 28, 1972) is an American former professional ice hockey player who played in the National Hockey League (NHL) in a 18-year career with the Winnipeg Jets, Phoenix Coyotes, St. Louis Blues and Atlanta Thrashers, retiring in 2010. His sons Matthew and Brady play for the Florida Panthers and the Ottawa Senators, respectively. He is one of five American-born players to score 500 goals, and is the sixth American player to score 1,000 points. He is considered to be one of the greatest U.S.-born players in NHL history. He is one of 47 players to have scored 500 goals, but he is one of five eligible players to not be a member of the Hockey Hall of Fame.

Playing career

Early career/background
Tkachuk, from East Boston originally, was born at the Melrose/Wakefield Hospital in Melrose, Massachusetts, and played high school hockey at Malden Catholic High School in Malden, Massachusetts. Tkachuk played one season of collegiate hockey at Boston University, was a member of the United States national junior team in 1991 and 1992 and a member of Team USA in 1992. He was drafted in the first round, 19th overall, in the 1990 NHL Entry Draft by the Winnipeg Jets, who acquired the pick from the Buffalo Sabres in the deal that sent Dale Hawerchuk to Buffalo. Tkachuk played as a center, left winger and right winger in his career.

Tkachuk has earned the nickname "Walt" (given to him by Eddie Olczyk), possibly in reference to Walter Tkaczuk, a star center who played for the New York Rangers from 1967 to 1981. The two players' last names are pronounced similarly but spelled differently (being the Polish and English transliterations, respectively, of the Ukrainian "Ткачук"), and the two men are not related to each other. With his strong play in front of the net, using his size and strength to battle opposing defensemen, St. Louis Blues broadcasters and fans dubbed Tkachuk "Big Walt."

Winnipeg Jets (1992–1996) 
Only days after the end of the 1992 Winter Olympics, Tkachuk made his NHL debut on February 28, 1992, against the Vancouver Canucks, where he tallied an assist. He would finish the season playing with the Jets, scoring eight points in 17 games. In the Stanley Cup playoffs that year, he scored three goals in seven games. The following season, 1992–93, was Tkachuk's official rookie year. He appeared in 83 games and ended the season with 28 goals and 51 points, including a 12–game scoring streak from March 9 to April 3, 1993.

Tkachuk became the team captain the next season on November 3, 1993, two weeks after recording his first hat-trick, against the Philadelphia Flyers. Some of his accomplishments from that season include leading the Jets in goals (41), points (81) and power-play goals (22). The 1994–95 season, which was shortened by a labor lockout, saw Tkachuk earn all-star second-team honors, as well as being second on the Jets in points scored.

At the start of 1995–96 season, Tkachuk, a restricted free agent at the time, signed a lucrative, front-loaded five-year offer sheet worth $17 million, with $6 million coming in the first season from the Chicago Blackhawks. Despite the Jets' impending relocation to Phoenix, Arizona, and the organization's poor financial situation, the Jets matched the offer-sheet within six hours. As a result, Tkachuk was stripped of the captaincy and replaced by Kris King; nonetheless, he set a career-high 50 goals and 98 points, the closest he ever came to reaching the 100-point plateau. Tkachuk also led the Jets in power play goals (20), game-winning goals (6), shots (249) and plus-minus rating (+11).

Going up against the Presidents' Trophy-winning Detroit Red Wings, the Jets lost in six games, with Tkachuk scoring a goal and two assists in the series. After losing Game 6 by a score of 4–1, the final Jets game in the city of Winnipeg before relocating to Phoenix, Tkachuk led the Jets in a final skate around Winnipeg Arena in appreciation of the fans.

Phoenix Coyotes (1996–2001) 

The Jets relocated to Phoenix, Arizona, in 1996, where Tkachuk remained a member of the newly named Phoenix Coyotes and was re-appointed captain, replacing Kris King. It was with Phoenix during the 1996–97 season that he had his career-best 52 goals, and made his first appearance in the NHL All-Star Game. He also led the team in goals, points, power-play goals, game-winning goals and shots for the 1997–98 season, earning him his second-straight All-Star appearance. For the 1998–99 season, Tkachuk led the team in goals, power-play goals, game-winning goals, shots and plus-minus, and again was named to the All-Star Game. In 1997, Tkachuk appeared on the front cover of the video game NHL Breakaway '98.

After struggling with injuries for the next two seasons, the Coyotes traded Tkachuk to the St. Louis Blues in 2001 in exchange for Ladislav Nagy, Michal Handzuš, Jeff Taffe and a first-round draft pick (Ben Eager), where he was re-united with former teammate Dallas Drake, who had signed a free agent deal with the Blues in the summer of 2000. Tkachuk would leave the Coyotes ranking second in all-time goals (323) and first in penalty minutes (1,508), among other records.

St. Louis Blues (2001–2007) 

Tkachuk made an immediate impact on the Blues, scoring six goals and eight points in the final 12 games of the 2000–01 season. The Blues made it to the Western Conference Final in the playoffs that season, ultimately losing to the Colorado Avalanche, the eventual 2001 Stanley Cup champions. Tkachuk experienced several injuries while playing with the Blues, and was briefly suspended by the team when he reported to training camp overweight, failing his physical at the beginning of the 2005–06 season.

Atlanta Thrashers (2007) 
On February 25, 2007, Tkachuk was traded to the Atlanta Thrashers in exchange for Glen Metropolit, a first-round pick in 2007, a third-round pick in 2007 and a second-round pick in 2008.

Return to St. Louis (2007–2010) 

On June 26 of the same year, St. Louis reacquired Tkachuk, along with a conditional fourth-round draft pick, in exchange for a conditional first-round pick in 2008. (If Tkachuk had re-signed with the Thrashers, the Blues would have acquired Atlanta's first-round pick in 2008.) Since the Blues acquired exclusive negotiating rights with Tkachuk and re-signed him to a two-year deal, Atlanta received a conditional fourth-round pick in 2008.
Tkachuk signed a new, two-year contract with the Blues for $8 million on June 30. Upon re-signing, Tkachuk said of the Blues, "I see a lot of good things happening... They're going to be very active in making this a better hockey team." To help prove the Blues would be better, after signing Tkachuk, they signed left winger Paul Kariya. Blues Head Coach Andy Murray announced that he would try a line where Tkachuk would be centering Kariya on left wing and Brad Boyes on the right.

On the last day of the 2007–08 regular season, April 6, Tkachuk scored his 500th NHL goal, a milestone only three other American-born players have achieved, as well as the 41st player to reach the milestone in NHL history.

On November 30, 2008, Tkachuk scored goal number 511, giving him 1,000 NHL points for his career. He became only the sixth American, and 72nd overall, to achieve that milestone; it came in his 1,077th NHL game. He signed a one-year contract extension with the Blues on June 19, 2009. On April 7, 2010, Tkachuk announced that he would be retiring from hockey at the conclusion of the 2009–10 season. He played his final NHL game two nights later on April 9, 2010.

Style of play

One of the elite power forwards of his era, Tkachuk was known for his aggressive, physical style while consistently scoring points. Tkachuk had more than 100 penalty minutes in 10 of his 19 NHL seasons, including three seasons with over 200 penalty minutes. Tkachuk was known for his goal-scoring prowess, scoring 30 goals eight times, including two 40-goal seasons and two back-to-back 50 goal seasons, the latter of which he led the NHL in goals, with 52.

Personal life 
Tkachuk has been married to Chantal Oster, whom he met in Winnipeg, since February 28, 1997, and has three children — Matthew, Brady, and Taryn. He is still a fan favorite in St. Louis and is an investor in sports talk radio station KFNS (590 AM, St. Louis MO). He is an assistant coach with the St. Louis Blues Peewee AAA hockey team.

Tkachuk is Irish on his mother's side, and is cousin to New Jersey Devils general manager Tom Fitzgerald, with whom he grew up. When asked about the derivation of his Ukrainian surname, Tkachuk was unsure, suggesting it could either be "Polish, Russian, [or] Ukrainian, one of those." He is also cousins with brothers Jimmy and Kevin Hayes, the latter being a player for the Philadelphia Flyers, and the former, an NHL player who died on August 23, 2021.

Select milestones 
 1,000 games played — December 1, 2007, against the Chicago Blackhawks
 700 career points — April 5, 2002, against the Chicago Blackhawks
 400 career goals — October 12, 2003, against the Colorado Avalanche
 500 career goals — April 6, 2008, against the Columbus Blue Jackets
 1,000 career points — November 30, 2008, against the Atlanta Thrashers

Records 
Tkachuk led the NHL in goals during the 1996–97 season with 52, the first American-born player to do so. That season he was also only the fourth player in NHL history to record 50 goals and 200 penalty minutes in a single season.

Other records:
 Arizona Coyotes #2 franchise record for career game-winning goals (40)
 Arizona Coyotes franchise record for career penalty minutes (1,508)

Career statistics

Regular season and playoffs

International

Awards and honors

See also

 Power forward (ice hockey)
 List of NHL players with 50 goal seasons
 List of NHL players with 500 goals
 List of NHL players with 1,000 points
 List of NHL players with 2,000 career penalty minutes
 List of NHL players with 1,000 games played

References

External links
 

1972 births
Living people
American men's ice hockey left wingers
American people of Irish descent
American people of Slavic descent
American people of Ukrainian descent
American people of German descent
Atlanta Thrashers players
Boston University Terriers men's ice hockey players
Ice hockey players from Massachusetts
Ice hockey players at the 1992 Winter Olympics
Ice hockey players at the 1998 Winter Olympics
Ice hockey players at the 2002 Winter Olympics
Ice hockey players at the 2006 Winter Olympics
Malden Catholic High School alumni
Medalists at the 2002 Winter Olympics
National Hockey League All-Stars
National Hockey League first-round draft picks
National Hockey League players with retired numbers
Olympic silver medalists for the United States in ice hockey
People from Melrose, Massachusetts
Phoenix Coyotes players
Sportspeople from Middlesex County, Massachusetts
St. Louis Blues players
St. Louis Blues scouts
United States Hockey Hall of Fame inductees
Winnipeg Jets (1972–1996) captains
Winnipeg Jets (1979–1996) draft picks
Winnipeg Jets (1979–1996) players
American expatriate ice hockey players in Canada